The Crocodile Hunter is a wildlife documentary television series that was hosted by Steve Irwin and his wife, Terri. The series became popular due to Irwin's unconventional method and hands-on approach to nature.

The two-hour pilot episode, filmed in 1992, premiered on American cable television network, Discovery Channel in October 1996, followed by the official series premiere on Animal Planet on April 5, 1997. The series ended on June 18, 2004, two years before Irwin's death. 13 specials were broadcast between January 1, 1997 and September 4, 2007.

Series overview

Episodes

Pilot (1996)

Season 1 (1997)

Season 2 (1998)

Season 3 (1999–2000)

Season 4 (2000–02)

Season 5 (2002–04)

Specials
The following is a list of specials hosted by Irwin relating to the series, but that were not official episodes.

DVD Releases

DVD releases in Australia were distributed through Magna Pacific and were issued in volumes containing 2-3 episodes each, although some later volumes did contain up to 6 episodes. Most episodes released were from Season 2, and Seasons 3 through 5. No episodes from Season 1 were released. Some episode titles differ slightly from their original televised versions, and some episodes are extended versions. A DVD Collection is also available. It contains all episodes previously released combined on 20 discs.

Volume 1: The Story Behind Steve
Steve's Story
Big Croc Stories

Volume 2: Steve's Scariest Moments
Wildest Home Videos
Steve and the Dragon

Volume 3: Steve's Aussie Adventures
Australia's Wildest Frontier
Journey to the Red Centre

Volume 4: Deadly Snakes
Africa's Deadliest Snakes
Sidewinders of Arizona

Volume 5: Jungle Steve
Jungle in the Clouds
Faces in the Forest

Volume 6: A Crocodile's Revenge
Crocodiles of the Revolution
Graham's Revenge

Volume 7: Swimming with the Sharks
Whale Sharks of the Wild West
Sharks Outside the Cage

Volume 8: Crocodile Coast
Crocodile Coast
Search for a Super Croc

Volume 9: Wild Frontier of Africa
Wild Frontier of Africa
Croc Live! (Crocodile Hunter Diaries episode)

Volume 10: Legends of the Galapagos
Legends of the Galapagos
Last Primates of Madagascar

Volume 11: Lights! Croc! Action!
Captured on Camera
Lights! Croc! Action!
Outback to Hollywood

Volume 12: Reptiles of the Deep
Reptiles of the Deep: Turtles
Reptiles of the Deep: Sea Snakes
Reptiles of the Deep: Saurians

Volume 13: Island of Snakes
America's Deadliest Snakes
Island of Snakes
Spitting Cobras

Volume 14: Forces of Nature
Forces of Nature
Wildlife in Combat
Swimming with Alligators

Volume 15: All About Steve
Steve's Most Dangerous Adventures
Steve's Most Dangerous Crocodile Captures
Operation Steve

Volume 16: African Adventures
Reptiles of the Lost Continent
Dangerous Africans
Africa's Final Frontier

Volume 17: Surfing Snakes & Where Devils Run Wild
Where the Devils Run Wild
Last Waterholes of the Outback
A Handful of Elephants
Surfing Snakes
Big Croc Diaries (Special Edition)
They Shoot Crocodiles, Don't They?

Volume 18: River of the Damned
Wildest Baby Animal Video
River of the Damned
Casper: The White Crocodile (Extended)
Crocs in the City 
Tigers of Shark Bay
Ice Breaker

References

External links
 
 Australia Zoo Official Homepage

Crocodile Hunter episodes
Crocodile Hunter episodes
Crocodile Hunter episodes
Steve Irwin